The Edmund Rice Schools Trust (ERST) is a Catholic school network with responsibility for almost 100 schools in the Republic of Ireland. The trust is named after Edmund Ignatius Rice the founder of the Irish Christian Brothers who originally established and maintained the schools.  Today, the Trust supports those schools in line with the tenets of the Edmund Rice Schools Trust Charter. Similar trusts have been established in England, Northern Ireland and elsewhere.

The main object of the Trust is to ensure and foster the advancement of education and to further the aims and purposes of Catholic education in the Edmund Rice tradition in colleges, schools and other educational projects owned or operated by the Trusts in the different countries.

Northern Ireland
The Edmund Rice Schools Trust (NI) Ltd is the trustee body responsible for eight schools in Belfast, Glengormley, Armagh, Newry and Omagh:
 Christian Brothers Primary School, Armagh
 John Paul II Primary School, Belfast
 St. Patrick's Primary School, Belfast
 Abbey Christian Brothers' Grammar School, Newry
 All Saints College, Belfast
 Edmund Rice College, Glengormley
 Christian Brothers Grammar School, Omagh
 St. Mary's Christian Brothers' Grammar School, Belfast
These schools were formerly under the trusteeship of the Irish Christian Brothers. The Trust was launched in February 2009 and is based in the Westcourt Centre, Belfast.

References

Education in Ireland
Educational organisations based in the Republic of Ireland